Gregory Bittman is a prelate of the Roman Catholic Church and bishop of Nelson, British Columbia.

Gregory Bittman received the priestly ordination on 15 August 1996.

On July 14, 2012, an official news release from Vatican Information Service (VIS), an arm of the Holy See Press Office, stated that Pope Benedict XVI had appointed Father Gregory Bittman who, until then had been serving as the judicial vicar and as archdiocesan chancellor, as an auxiliary bishop of the Roman Catholic Archdiocese of Edmonton and titular bishop of Caltadria.

On February 6, 2018, Pope Francis appointed him the seventh Bishop of the Diocese of Nelson in southeastern British Columbia. He took possession of the Diocese on April 25, 2018.

References

Year of birth missing (living people)
Living people
People from  Nelson, British Columbia
21st-century Roman Catholic bishops in Canada
Roman Catholic bishops of Nelson